Guilherme dos Santos Torres (born 5 April 1991), commonly known as Guilherme, is a Brazilian professional footballer who plays as a defensive midfielder of Qatar Stars League football club Al Sadd.

Club career

Portuguesa
Born in Santo André, São Paulo, Guilherme Torres joined Portuguesa's youth setup in 2002 at the age of 11. He made his professional debut on 11 August 2009, starting in a 1–2 Série B away loss against Duque de Caxias. On 26 January 2011 Guilherme Torres scored his first professional goal, but in a 1–3 home loss against Ponte Preta. He was an undisputed starter during the year's Série B winning campaign, contributing with a career-best four goals in 35 appearances. Guilherme Torres made his Série A debut on 23 June 2012, playing the full 90 minutes in a 1–0 home win against São Paulo.

Corinthians
On 14 August 2012, after being strongly linked to Palmeiras, Guilherme Torres signed a five-year deal with Corinthians, for a R$7 million fee. He made his debut late in the month, coming on as a late substitute for Paulo André in a 1–2 home loss against São Paulo. Guilherme Torres scored his first goal for Timão, netting his team's second in a 3–1 home win against Grêmio. After the departure of Paulinho to Tottenham Hotspur in 2013, he was elected as first-choice.

Udinese
On 7 July 2014, Guilherme Torres agreed a transfer to Serie A club Udinese, signing a contract on 18 July. He made his debut in the category on 31 August, starting in a 2–0 home win against Empoli. A regular starter during the 2014–15 season, Guilherme lost his space in 2015–16 after the arrival of countryman Edenílson.

Deportivo La Coruña
On 16 July 2016, Guilherme Torres was loaned to La Liga club Deportivo de La Coruña for one year, with a buyout clause. 
Backed by the coaches’ trust, he went on to enjoy a brilliant first season in La Liga, becoming a regular in the Deportivo roster and convincing the Spaniards to activate his Udinese release clause of €4.5 million at the end of the season. After being a regular starter, Dépor activated his clause and he signed a permanent four-year contract with the club.

Eager to build on his progress and keep developing, Guilherme Torres had an excellent season in La Liga, although he was unable to prevent Deportivo from suffering relegation. Unwilling to take a step down to the Segunda Division, the midfielder searched for a way out from the Spanish club, finally sealing a transfer to Greek giants Olympiacos.

Olympiacos
On 17 August 2018, Guilherme Torres signed a three years contract with Superleague club Olympiacos after completing a €3 million transfer fee. His contract, which ran until 2021, was worth €750,000 per year. On 31 March 2019, he scored with a header his first goal for the championship from close range to convert Kostas Fortounis’s cross, in a 2–1 home win game against Atromitos.

On 8 April 2019, Guilherme Torres scored with a header after Kostas Fortounis skipped past a Panetolikos defender before crossing for the Brazilian midfielder in a 5–0 away hammering win against Panetolikos. A week later he scored a brace in a 4–0 home win game against Xanthi, the first coming in the 10th minute as the Brazilian headed in a Kostas Fortounis corner, and the second six minutes later as he side-footed home from Omar Elabdellaoui’s cross with a shell-shocked Xanthi struggling to contain the in-form home side.

Al Sadd
On 31 August 2020, Guilherme Torres joined Qatari club, Al Sadd for a transfer fee at the range of €6 million.

Career statistics

Honours

Club
Olympiacos 
 Super League Greece: 2019–20
 Greek Cup: 2019–20

Al Sadd
 Qatar Stars League: 2020–21
 Qatar Cup: 2020, 2021
 QSL Cup: 2020–21

Individual
Super League Greece Team of the Year: 2018–19

References

External links
 
 

1991 births
Living people
People from Santo André, São Paulo
Brazilian footballers
Association football midfielders
Campeonato Brasileiro Série A players
Campeonato Brasileiro Série B players
Associação Portuguesa de Desportos players
Sport Club Corinthians Paulista players
Super League Greece players
Olympiacos F.C. players
Serie A players
Udinese Calcio players
La Liga players
Deportivo de La Coruña players
Qatar Stars League players
Al Sadd SC players
Brazilian expatriate footballers
Brazilian expatriate sportspeople in Italy
Brazilian expatriate sportspeople in Spain
Brazilian expatriate sportspeople in Greece
Brazilian expatriate sportspeople in Qatar
Expatriate footballers in Italy
Expatriate footballers in Spain
Expatriate footballers in Greece
Expatriate footballers in Qatar
Footballers from São Paulo (state)